"Next Plane Out" is a song by Canadian singer Celine Dion, recorded for her third English-language album, The Colour of My Love (1993). It was released as the fifth single in Australia in October 1995. "Next Plane Out" was written by Diane Warren and produced by Guy Roche. Strings arrangements and conducted by composer Scott Harper.

Background and release
The music video for the song, directed by Greg Masuak, was also used in edited versions for the "Je sais pas" and "Call the Man" singles (neither was released as a single in Australia). The "Next Plane Out" music video used the album version of the song, which lasts almost five minutes.

The single reached number 61 on the Australian ARIA singles chart, and spent 7 weeks in the top 100.

Critical reception
Pip Ellwood-Hughes from Entertainment Focus called the song "gorgeous", adding that it "is a vocal masterclass that makes you realise just what an incredible singer Dion is." Christopher Smith from TalkAboutPopMusic described "Next Plane Out" as a ballad "which takes some time to ‘get off the ground’".

Formats and track listings
Australian CD and cassette single
"Next Plane Out" (Radio Edit) – 4:37
"The Last to Know" – 4:35
"Love Can Move Mountains" – 4:53

Charts

References

External links

1993 songs
1995 singles
1990s ballads
Celine Dion songs
Pop ballads
Songs written by Diane Warren